Platform Spur is a wedge-shaped sandstone platform which rises to 2,350 m and tapers to the northeast, between Bindschadler Glacier and Jezek Glacier in the northwest part of Royal Society Range, Victoria Land. It was descriptively named by Alan Sherwood, New Zealand Geological Survey party leader in the area, 1987–88.

Ridges of Victoria Land
Scott Coast